Sandnes is a village in Risør municipality in Agder county, Norway.

References

Villages in Agder
Risør